James Teitsma  is a Canadian provincial politician, who was elected as the Member of the Legislative Assembly of Manitoba for the riding of Radisson in the 2016 election. He is a member of the Progressive Conservative party, and defeated NDP challenger Preet Singh.

He was re-elected in the 2019 provincial election.

In February 2020, Teitsma faced backlash for posting opposition to a proposed program to provide breakfast to all schoolchildren in Manitoba schools, stating that it would be better for families if children are able to eat meals at home.

In January 2021, James Teitsma faced public criticism for his disregard of Manitoba provincial COVID-19 guidelines which stated “avoid all non-essential travel”, and took his family on a 10-day driving trip through Western Canada during the December 2020 holiday season. He has not faced any consequences for his decision.

Electoral results

References 

1971 births
Living people
Progressive Conservative Party of Manitoba MLAs
Politicians from Winnipeg
21st-century Canadian politicians